Florent Nicolas Crabeels (5 December 1829, Antwerp – 7 June 1896, Antwerp) was a Belgian genre and landscape painter.

Life and work
He studied at the Royal Academy of Fine Arts in Antwerp, with Jacob Jacobs and Egide Linnig. 

At first, he painted scenes from villages and small town markets. Later, he turned to landscapes from the Kempen region, and became an ardent supporter of painting en plein aire.

In 1886, he was one of the founding members of "L’Art Indépendant". He became a Neo-Impressionist and returned to painting genre scenes around 1890.

In addition to being a painter, he was also well known as an engraver.

Sources 
 Paul Bergmans: "Crabeels, Florent Nicolas". In: Ulrich Thieme (Ed.): Allgemeines Lexikon der Bildenden Künstler von der Antike bis zur Gegenwart, Vol.8: Coutan–Delattre. E. A. Seemann, Leipzig 1912, pp.41–42 (Online)
 Camille Lemonnier, L’Ecole belge de Peinture (1830-1905), 1906, reprinted in 1991, Editions Labor,

External links 

 More works by Crabeels @ ArtNet
 "Crabeels, Florent" in: Dictionnaire des peintres belges (Online)

1829 births
1896 deaths
Belgian painters
Belgian genre painters
Belgian landscape painters
Royal Academy of Fine Arts (Antwerp) alumni
Artists from Antwerp